Book City is a  Canadian independent book store chain based out of Toronto.

History 
Book City opened its first store in the Annex neighborhood of Toronto in 1976. Over 35 years Book City has operated 7 stores at various locations in Toronto (although only 4 remain extant) and is well known in the city. The company is family-owned and operated, and runs from the head office in the Beaches location.

Current Locations 
Book City Bloor West Village - 2354 Bloor St. West
Book City on Danforth - 348 Danforth Ave.
Book City in the Beach - 1950 Queen St. East
Book City St. Clair - 1430 Yonge Street

Notes

External links
Book City

Independent bookstores of Canada